The Icono Tower is a building in Asuncion, Paraguay. It is the tallest building in Paraguay, surpassing former Wilson Tower. It was completed in 2013. It is one of the most dominant skyscrapers in South America.

References

External links
 Icono Tower

Skyscrapers in Asunción